The following lists events that happened during 1982 in Singapore.

Incumbents
President: C.V. Devan Nair
Prime Minister: Lee Kuan Yew

Events

January
 1 January – The time zone in Singapore has changed to UTC+08:00 and it has not changed since.
 2 January – The metric system of weights and measures is introduced, replacing the Imperial units.

February
23 February – The Sentosa Monorail is opened, making travelling convenient for visitors.

March
 20–24 March - The first Festival of Dance (which was the early form of the current Singapore Arts Festival) was held at Victoria Theatre.

May
 14 May – Singa the Lion is unveiled as the National Courtesy Campaign's mascot, being launched two weeks later.
 28 May – The Government allows the building of the Mass Rapid Transit after a 10-year debate. The first lines to be constructed are the North South MRT line and the East West MRT line, scheduled for 1984. To fund the MRT, money earned from land plots in Marina Bay will be used.

June
 11 June – The Sentosa Musical Fountain is officially opened. It ran for 25 years until its closure in 2007.

July
 1 July – New Nation newspaper is replaced by Singapore Monitor.
 25 July – The first locally produced drama, Seletar Robbery, is shown on SBC 8.

October
 1 October – The Postal Services Department merges into the Telecommunication Authority of Singapore, giving better services.

November
 6 November – The National Civil Defence Plan was launched, setting guidelines for emergency preparations.

Date unknown
Ang Peng Siong was ranked world's No.1 in 1982 for clocking 22.69s in the 50m freestyle during the US Nationals and was named the World's Fastest Swimmer for 1982 by Swimming World magazine.

Births
 24 January – Fiona Xie, actress.
 2 June – Jonathan Leong, singer, runner-up of Singapore Idol (Season 2).
 7 September – Race Wong, former singer and 2R member, entrepreneur and co-founder of Ohmyhome.

Deaths
22 June – Lancelot Maurice Pennefather, famous sportsman (b. 1894).
29 October – Lim Yong Liang, Singaporean footballer (b. 1900).

References

 
Years in Singapore